Stiphodon percnopterygionus is a species of goby found in the Pacific Ocean on the Asian side from the Ryukyu Islands and Taiwan in Asia out to Guam, the Mariana Islands and Babelthuap, Palau in the south Pacific.  
This species can reach a length of  SL.

References

percnopterygionus
Taxa named by Ronald E. Watson
Taxa named by Chen I-Shiung
Fish described in 1998